Aframomum rostratum is a species in the ginger family, Zingiberaceae. It was first described by Karl Moritz Schumann.

Range
Aframomum rostratum is native to Eastern Cameroon, Gabon, Middle Congo, and Angola.

References 

rostratum